The Brass Bullet is a 1918 American adventure film serial directed by Ben F. Wilson. It is now considered to be a lost film.

Cast

 Juanita Hansen as Rosalind Joy
 Jack Mulhall as Jack James
 Charles Hill Mailes as Homer Joy
 Joseph W. Girard as Spring Gilbert
 Harry Dunkinson
 Helen Wright as Mrs. Strong
 Ashton Dearholt as Victor King
 Charles Force as A minister
 Hallam Cooley as The Mystery Man

Chapter titles
 A Flying Start
 The Muffled Man
 The Mysterious Murder
 Smoked Out
 The Mock Bride
 A Dangerous Honeymoon
 Pleasure Island
 The Magnetic Bug
 The Room of Flame
 A New Peril
 Evil Waters
 Caught By Wireless
 $500 Reward
 On Trial For His Life
 In The Shadow
 The Noose
 The Avenger
 The Amazing Confession

Reception

Like many American films of the time, The Brass Bullet was subject to cuts by city and state film censorship boards. For example, the Chicago Board of Censors required cuts:
 in Chapter 1, Reel 1, of a closeup of currency; 
 in Chapter 2, Reel 2, two scenes of chloroforming a young woman and the shooting of a man through window; 
 in Chapter 3, shooting man through window and the slugging of a young man; 
 in Chapter 4, setting fire to cotton in lighthouse and last two scenes of the man sinking in quicksand; 
 in Chapter 5, Reel 2, last scene of the man trying to force the cabin door; 
 in Chapter 6, Reel 1, two scenes of slugging a policeman, Reel 2, all but last scene of the man pounding on the bride's door before she admits him, all scenes of the man forcibly entering the room and struggle scenes with the woman, the man looking through keyhole and breaking down door, and the three intertitles "Open that door. I have a right to come in", "My wife shall obey me", and "Oh, please don't touch me"; 
 in Chapter 7, Reel 1, all scenes of the man struggling with the young woman on bed, all scenes of the man in a woman's stateroom, aviator dropping bomb on the vessel, Reel 2, slugging man with a gun; 
 in Chapter 10, Reel 1, slugging scene and, Reel 2, the intertitle "Send me her dead body and I will give you $5,000"; 
 in Chapter 11, Reel 1, shooting of man through a hole in floor, throwing man into the river, Reel 2, gagging and binding a young woman; 
 in Chapter 12, the stealing of jewelry from a bag and the last three scenes of threatening a young woman with a gun; 
 Chapter 13, Reel 1, the vision of the taxi driver, the young woman at bar with the man, all scenes where "mother" is shown, all scenes of young woman in spangled gown is shown except one where she recognizes Rosalind, Reel 2, all scenes of young woman in spangled gown is shown except one where she is with Rosalind, all scenes with the black maid except where she helps Rosalind with gown, the intertitle "I just took a gold mine to 'mother's'", all scenes in ballroom, and the last part of scene where a knife is descending slowly over a woman on a table; 
 in Chapter 14, Reel 1, two scenes of man struggling with young woman on table, fourteen scenes of "mother" except where she is in the background, three views of groups of people on stairs during the young woman's song, old man making advances on young woman to include kissing her and offering her money, the entire incident of the black maid at the door, and the intertitle "So my unfortunate niece has fallen to this —?"; 
 in Chapter 16, Reel 2, all scenes of the man on a scaffold with a black cap on his head and noose around his neck; 
 in Chapter 17, Reel 1, eleven scenes of man with shroud over head on scaffold, three scenes of throwing hand grenades from airplane, scene with shooting of guard; 
 and, in Chapter 18, Reel 1, change the intertitle "A particular will prevented my marriage" etc. to "A particular will prevented the acknowledgement of our marriage by Mr. Joy until Rosiland was twenty-five years old" etc., shorten the choking scene, and the shooting of King.

See also
 List of film serials
 List of film serials by studio

References

External links

1918 films
1918 adventure films
1918 lost films
American black-and-white films
American silent serial films
American adventure films
Films directed by Ben F. Wilson
Lost American films
Lost adventure films
Universal Pictures film serials
1910s American films
Silent adventure films